Marvin Singleton (born October 7, 1939) is an American politician who served in the Missouri Senate from the 32nd district from 1990 to 2003.

References

1939 births
Living people
Republican Party Missouri state senators